Washington Township High School may refer to:

Washington Township High School (Indiana), Valparaiso, Indiana
Washington Township High School (New Jersey), Sewell, New Jersey